On December 11, 1922, George Gay was Lynched in Streetman a town that straddles the border of Freestone and Navarro counties in Texas. He allegedly assaulted a young girl. According to the United States Senate Committee on the Judiciary it was the 60th of 61 lynchings during 1922 in the United States.

Background

Tensions in the region were very high as a number of Black men had been lynched in the area.  away from Streetman on May 6, 1922, three Black men were Lynched in Kirvin, Texas for allegedly murdering 17-year-old Eula Ausley.  away from Streetman, in Waco, Texas, Jesse Thomas was Lynched on May 26, 1922. All were killed with little to no evidence.

In Streetman, the daughter of Mrs. W.S. Grayson, 20-year-old Miss Florine Grayson, was a teacher at Birdston school. On Monday, December 11, 1922, someone attacked her at 6:45 AM when they threw a sack over her head and stuffed her mouth with a cloth (some reports say mouth stuffed with cotton). She was able to get free and yell loud enough that help quickly arrived.

George Gay was a 25-year-old Black man that lived  from the Grayson house. At 10:45 he was seized upon and seemed to have another piece of cloth that matched the cloth used as a gag in the attack. He was brought before Florine Grayson but she couldn't positively identify him as the attacker. Bloodhounds were asked to be brought in from Huntsville in order to find the attacker.

Lynching

Word had spread throughout the region and a crowd some 2,000 strong had gathered demanding justice. Sheriff Horace Mayo of Freestone county sensing things getting out of his control tried to move George Gay to a safer location. Before he could be moved an estimated 250 vehicles blocked the Sheriff and the mob seized George Gay. At 2:50 PM George Gay was chained to a tree and shot over 300 times.

Aftermath
A second man was implicated in the attack, Roger Payne. A Black man was almost lynched when he was mistaken by the mob as Payne. Luckily he was able to prove that he was not him and was released.

National memorial 

The National Memorial for Peace and Justice, in Montgomery, Alabama, displays 805 hanging steel rectangles, each representing the counties in the United States where a documented lynching took place and, for each county, the names of those lynched. The memorial hopes that communities, like Freestone or Navarro where George Gay was lynched, will take their slab and install it in their own community.

Bibliography 
Notes

References 
 - Total pages: 668 

 

1922 riots
1922 in Texas
African-American history of Texas
Lynching deaths in Texas 
February 1922 events
Protest-related deaths
Racially motivated violence against African Americans 
Riots and civil disorder in Texas 
White American riots in the United States